Bezimienni bohaterowie is a 1932 Polish romance film directed by Michał Waszyński.

Cast
Maria Bogda ...  Janina Reńska
Adam Brodzisz ...  Andrzej Tulesza absolwent szkoły policyjnej
Eugeniusz Bodo ...  Komisarz Szczerbic
Wiktor Biegański ...  Szef szajki Goppe
Zula Pogorzelska...  Koleżanka Janiny
Stefan Jaracz
Paweł Owerłło
Czesław Skonieczny
Wiesław Gawlikowski
Stanisław Sielański
Jerzy Roland
Czesław Raniszewski

References

External links 
 

1932 films
1930s Polish-language films
Polish black-and-white films
Films directed by Michał Waszyński
1930s romance films
Polish romance films